Kavaliauskas is the masculine form of a Lithuanian family surname. Its feminine forms are: Kavaliauskienė (married woman or widow) and Kavaliauskaitė (unmarried woman).

The surname may refer to:
Antanas Kavaliauskas (born 1984), Lithuanian professional basketball player
Egidijus Kavaliauskas (born 1988), Lithuanian professional boxer
Vitalijus Kavaliauskas (born 1983), Lithuanian footballer
Alina Briedelytė-Kavaliauskienė (1942–1992), Lithuanian painter

Lithuanian-language surnames